Eric Kamau Grávátt (born March 6, 1947) is a jazz drummer from Philadelphia. He has played with McCoy Tyner, Joe Henderson, Weather Report, Byard Lancaster, Dom Um Romão. He was a member of Weather Report from 1972–1974.

Discography
With Byard Lancaster
 It's Not Up to Us (Vortex, 1966 [1968])
With Lloyd McNeill
Asha (1969)
Washington Suite (1970)
With Weather Report
 I Sing the Body Electric (Columbia, 1972)
 Live in Tokyo (Columbia, 1972)
 Sweetnighter (Columbia, 1973)
With Julian Priester
Love, Love (ECM, 1973)
With Eddie Henderson
 Inside Out (Capricorn, 1974)
With Joe Henderson
 Canyon Lady (Milestone, 1975)
With McCoy Tyner
 Focal Point (Milestone 1976)
 Inner Voices (Milestone, 1977)
With Tony Hymas
Hope Street MN (nato, 2002)

References

External links

American jazz drummers
Musicians from Philadelphia
Weather Report members
Columbia Records artists
ECM Records artists
Milestone Records artists
1947 births
Living people
20th-century American drummers
American male drummers
Jazz musicians from Pennsylvania
20th-century American male musicians
American male jazz musicians